This list of aviation awards is an index to articles about notable awards given in the field of aviation. It includes a list of awards for winners of competitions or records, a list of awards by the Society of Experimental Test Pilots, various other awards and list of aviation halls of fame.

Competitions and records

Awards for speed and distance of flights were popular in the early days of aviation, and some continue today.

Society of Experimental Test Pilots awards

The Society of Experimental Test Pilots, an international organization based in the United States, offers or has offered various awards.

Other awards

North American aviation halls of fame

See also

 Lists of awards
 Lists of science and technology awards

References

 
Aviation